is a fictional character and the main protagonist of the Kirby series of video games owned by Nintendo and HAL Laboratory. He first appeared in Kirby's Dream Land (1992), a platform game for the Game Boy. Since then, Kirby has starred in over 40 games, ranging from action platformers to puzzle, racing, and even pinball, and has been featured as a playable character in every installment of the Super Smash Bros. series (1999–present). He has also starred in his own anime and manga series. Since 1999, he has been voiced by Makiko Ohmoto.

Kirby is well known for his ability to inhale objects and creatures to gain their powers, as well as his ability to float by expanding his body. He uses these abilities to rescue various lands, including his homeworld of Planet Popstar, from evil forces and antagonists, such as Dark Matter or Nightmare. On these adventures, he often crosses paths with his rivals, King Dedede and Meta Knight, though Meta Knight can be seen as a hero, depending on the game. Kirby has been described as one of the most legendary video game characters of all time by PC World. In virtually all his appearances, Kirby is depicted as cheerful, innocent and food-loving; however, he becomes fearless, bold, and clever in the face of danger.

Concept and creation
Kirby was created by Masahiro Sakurai as the player character of the 1992 game Kirby's Dream Land (1992). The character's design was intended to serve as placeholder graphics for the game's original protagonist in early development and thus was given a simplistic ball-like appearance. Sakurai switched to the placeholder design for the final character design when he believed that it served the character better. The character was known as  during development until the name "Kirby" was chosen from a draft list of potential names. Shigeru Miyamoto stated that "Kirby" was chosen in honor of American lawyer John Kirby, who defended Nintendo in the Universal City Studios, Inc. v. Nintendo Co., Ltd. case in 1984 and that the harsh-sounding name contrasted amusingly with the character's cute appearance.

Kirby appears white in Kirby's Dream Land (1992) due to the grayscale palette of the Game Boy system. Sakurai intended the character to be pink, though Miyamoto had originally thought the character to be yellow. Kirby does appear white in the game's North American promotional materials and artwork to reflect the character's in-game appearance. Miyamoto's color choice was repurposed for the second player character in Kirby's Dream Course (1994), and since Kirby: Nightmare in Dream Land (2002) has been the default color for a second player Kirby in the Kirby and Super Smash Bros. series.

In North America, Kirby consistently appears in artwork with a more striking, bolder expression than in Japan, where his expression is more relaxed. Nintendo has said that the more battle-ready appearance appeals to a wider audience in North America.

Characteristics

Physical appearance
Kirby has a pink, spherical, body with small stubby arms and large red feet (not shoes). His eyes are a distinctive oval shape and are white (eye shine) at the top, black in the center and dark blue on the bottom (all black in early games) with rosy cheek-blushes near his eyes. His body is soft and flexible, allowing him to stretch or flatten and adopt different shapes, open his mouth very wide to inhale foes, or inflate himself with air and fly. He is 20 cm (about 8 in) tall. Originally in Kirby's Dream Course (1994) and recurring in several games starting with Kirby: Nightmare in Dream Land (2002), different colored Kirbys appear as other players in multi-player games. In the case of Kirby & the Amazing Mirror (2004), they are the result of Kirby being divided into four by Dark Meta Knight.

Personality
Kirby hails from the distant Planet Popstar, where he lives in a dome-shaped house in the country of Dream Land. He has a positive attitude, and frequently helps to save Dream Land through the use of his unique powers. His age is never directly stated, although he is referred to as a "little boy" in the English manual for Kirby's Dream Land (1992), described as a baby with a projected 200 years until adulthood in the anime, and was referred to as being a "jolly fellow" in Kirby Super Star.

Kirby is cheerful and innocent. He eagerly assists those in need of help and readily attempts to befriend others upon first meeting them, a naïvety that may leave Kirby to be taken by surprise or betrayed. He is often depicted with a voracious appetite. The games (first stated in the English manual for Kirby's Dream Land 2 (1995)) describes his favorite food as Maxim Tomatoes, a healing item in the franchise that restores all health in most games. Some games such as Kirby: Squeak Squad (2006) and Kirby's Dream Buffet (2022) have shown Kirby to have a strong fondness of strawberries and strawberry shortcake. In the anime, his favorite food is instead stated to be watermelons. His other hobbies include singing (although he is tone-deaf), fishing, napping, and drawing (done in a very childlike style). Kirby is mildly entomophobic, as he does not like caterpillars.

Abilities
Kirby's main ability, Copy, consists of inhaling enemies and objects and spitting them out with incredible force. Both his mouth and body expand to allow him to inhale things much larger than himself. However, there is a limit to what he can inhale; excessively large or heavy foes like bosses can resist Kirby's inhale. Against these opponents Kirby must find smaller characters to use as ammo or intercept his opponent's attacks and send them back at them. Kirby Super Star (1996) greatly expanded on the concept of Copy Abilities from Kirby's Adventure (1993). Originally Kirby just obtained one move from a Copy Ability which replaced his Inhale but Kirby Super Star introduced multiple fighting techniques for each ability with their own controls. Additionally while Kirby's Adventure didn't have Kirby's appearance drastically change when he had a Copy Ability, aside from his color changing to orange or snow white, or wielding a weapon for abilities like Sword or Hammer. Kirby Super Star gave each Copy Ability its own costume, such as a fiery crown for Fire Kirby or a floppy green cap that resembles Link's for Sword Kirby. Near the end of games, Kirby may access a "Last Battle Ability", wherein Kirby utilizes a special often magical weapon to defeat the final boss (ex. the Star Rod in Kirby's Adventure (1993), Ribbon's Crystal in Kirby 64: The Crystal Shards (2000), Landia in Kirby's Return to Dream Land (2011)).

In Kirby Super Star (1996), Kirby can sacrifice his current Copy Ability to create a 'Helper', an allied version of the enemy Kirby typically gets that ability from. The new Helper could be controlled by the game or a second player. This feature has not yet been included in later Kirby games, although it was included in Kirby Super Stars remake, Kirby Super Star Ultra (2008) and was intended to return in the cancelled GameCube Kirby game which would have had Kirby able to make up to four helpers at once. Kirby Star Allies (2018) has a similar mechanic where after being struck by a pink heart that fell from the sky, Kirby becomes able to create small pink hearts known as Friend Hearts which allow him to make friends with an enemy. This also causes the befriended enemy to change colors, presumably to aid the player in distinguishing enemies from friends. The maximum amount of friends Kirby can make is about three. To make another friend, Kirby will have to choose to "un-friend" one of his allies, which will make it disappear in replacement for the new ally.

Following the introduction of Copy in Kirby's Adventure (1993), the Kirby games have introduced over sixty Copy Abilities (the largest roster of which was in Star Allies, at 28). The series has regularly included new game mechanics unique to titles that alter, differ from, or outright replace Kirby's ability to copy enemies. 
 In Kirby 64: The Crystal Shards (2000), the "Power Combo" allows Kirby to hold two Copy Abilities at once, mixing identical ones for a stronger version or combining different ones for a whole new ability (ex. Spark and Cutter abilities combine to create a double-sided lightsaber.)
 In both Kirby: Canvas Curse (2005) and Kirby and the Rainbow Curse (2015), Kirby is a continuously rolling ball that can be directed on strokes of paint/ropes of clay drawn with the stylus of the Nintendo DS/Wii U respectively.
 In Kirby's Epic Yarn (2010), Kirby is turned into an outline of yarn, leaving his hollow body unable to inhale. Instead Kirby is able to use a "yarn-whip" to unravel enemies or transform into simple objects, requiring "Metamortex Patches" to become more complex "Metamortex Transformations". Similar transformations with clay are also seen in Kirby and the Rainbow Curse. In the rerelease Kirby's Extra Epic Yarn (2019), Kirby may use Ravel Abilities: power ups that recreate Copy Abilities using craft materials.
 In Kirby Mass Attack (2011), Kirby is cursed into being unable to inhale or copy enemies and can exist as up to ten small, weaker versions of himself. Directed or thrown using the Nintendo DS' stylus, the Kirbys defeat enemies by ganging up and pummeling them. 
 In Kirby's Return to Dream Land (2011), Kirby can use much more powerful, albeit temporary, versions of Copy Abilities by inhaling and swallowing special kinds of enemies surrounded with a multicolored aura; these abilities are known as Super Abilities. One example is the Grand Hammer, which grants Kirby the usage of a much larger version of the hammer granted by the normal Hammer ability which can produce shockwaves.
 In Kirby: Planet Robobot (2016), Kirby steals "Robobot Armor": a mech suit from an invading robot army. The Robobot Armor works in conjunction with Kirby's Copy ability, (ex. wielding buzzsaws when ridden by Cutter Kirby), as well as providing tools to surpass unique obstacles.
 In Kirby and the Forgotten Land (2022), Kirby gains a new ability: his extremely elastic skin allows him to inhale large objects and take on their shape; this ability is referred to as "Mouthful Mode". During this state, Kirby is able to control whatever he inhaled as if he was the object himself; for example, when Kirby inhales a car, he is able to make it drive around, or in the case of a light bulb, make it turn on and off at will. In addition, Kirby's copy abilities are able to be upgraded to be made more powerful. For example, once fully upgraded, Kirby's fire ability becomes Dragon Fire, which allowed him to shoot further and glide briefly in mid-air.

In the Super Smash Bros. series, Kirby's Copy works distinctly different from how it does in the Kirby series with a unique arsenal of Copy Abilities. Without an ability, Kirby can use attacks from different abilities (ex. Cutter's Final Cutter, Hammer's Hammer Flip, Stone's Stone Change). Kirby obtains an ability by inhaling another member of the roster, acquiring an ability themed around the character and possessing some of the fighter's move set. Unlike enemies in the Kirby game, fighters swallowed by Kirby do not disappear, instead reappearing outside Kirby. In Super Smash Bros. Brawl (2008), Kirby's Final Smash is his Cook ability from Kirby Super Star (1996)/Kirby Super Star Ultra (2008), which cooks opponents, items and more. In Super Smash Bros. for Nintendo 3DS and Wii U (2014) and Super Smash Bros. Ultimate (2018), Kirby's Final Smash is an Ultra Sword attack from Return to Dream Land (2011).

Species
Although never explored in great detail in the series, Kirby is not the only member of his kind. Along with the different colored Kirbys in many games' multiplayers, similar looking characters are seen in the ending of Kirby's Dream Land (1992), and its remake Spring Breeze in Kirby Super Star (1996). Meta Knight and Galacta Knight, both of whom bear a close resemblance to Kirby without their masks, are often hinted to be of the same species as Kirby. In general, members of the species all look similar, but sometimes have different colored skin, eyes, and feet. The second player character of Kirby's Dream Course (1994) is a yellow Kirby named Keeby with the same abilities as Kirby in the game. While it is not confirmed that the second player Kirby from Kirby: Nightmare in Dream Land (2002) onward is Keeby, Kirby's Dream Buffet (2022) names the yellow color customization "Keeby Yellow". The second player character of Kirby's Epic Yarn (2010), Prince Fluff, is a Kirby-like character from a planet made of sewing material. Unlike Kirby, Prince Fluff cannot inhale or copy enemies (which Kirby has also lost the ability to do after being turned into yarn) or use Ravel Abilities (equivalent to Copy Abilities added in Kirby's Extra Epic Yarn (2019)).

Later Kirby games have hinted on a much more drastic possibility of what life-form Kirby truly is. In Kirby Star Allies (2018), it is suggested repeatedly through pause-screen descriptions and visual references that Kirby is a positive reincarnation of a powerful entity known as Void; the true main antagonist of Kirby Star Allies and the overarching antagonist of the Kirby series, who is implied to have created Zero; the true main antagonist from Kirby's Dream Land 3 (1997) and Kirby 64: The Crystal Shards (2000), and by extension, the Dark Matter race; reoccurring antagonists in the Kirby series. This further suggests a connection between Kirby's species and Dark Matter.

No official term exists for them other than Kirby's species. They are commonly referred to as 'Kirbys' and is the name of both the species and character. As a name, however, 'Kirby' refers to only one character. In the English manual of Kirby & the Amazing Mirror (2004), the term 'Kirbys' is used at points, to illustrate the feature of having four differently colored versions of Kirby active in the game simultaneously, although in this situation the four "Kirbys" are four pieces of Kirby rather than four individual Kirby-like beings. Another common term is 'Dream Landers', a term used in the instruction manual for Kirby's Adventure (1992). This term, however, also refers to anyone who lives in Dream Land, including characters like King Dedede. The biography of Kirby in Super Smash Bros. Brawl (2008) says Kirby is a citizen of Dream Land. Sometimes the term 'puff' or 'puffball' is used in official materials to refer to Kirby's round shape, though this does not necessarily indicate the name of his species.

Gender
While the English manual for Kirby's Dream Land (1992) refers to Kirby as a "little boy", the Japanese Kirby encyclopedia Hoshi no Kābī Pupupu Taizen: 20th Anniversary (星のカービィプププ大全 : 20th Anniversary) lists Kirby's gender as "unknown". Kirby's creator, Masahiro Sakurai, wrote Kirby's profile which also lists the character's gender as "unknown" and once jokingly stated that Kirby may actually be female. Likewise, Kirby's voice actress, Makiko Ohmoto, stated that Kirby's gender is unknown and explained that she performs the character just as "Kirby" without caring about the character's gender, rather than as a man or a woman.

Appearances

Main series

Kirby's main media form are games, as he is the star and protagonist of the Nintendo and HAL Laboratory owned series named after him. Most Kirby games are platform games in which Kirby fights enemies, solves puzzles, and challenges bosses. Each game typically adds a new twist or change to Kirby's abilities that the levels of the game emphasize, such as combining power ups in Kirby 64 or Super Abilities in Return to Dream Land. Most games involve Kirby saving a world or even universe from a dark, evil force of some kind. Typical Kirby games have a powerful being, such as Dark Matter or Nightmare, controlling or corrupting a secondary villain.

The series has 37 games currently, with the first being Kirby's Dream Land in 1992 and the latest being Kirby's Return To Dream Land Deluxe in 2023. Although most are platform games, some spin-offs have included pinball, fighting, racing, and puzzle games.

Super Smash Bros. series
Kirby appears in the Super Smash Bros. series of games as a playable character, which is also created by Masahiro Sakurai. He is the sole Kirby series representative in Super Smash Bros. (1999) and Super Smash Bros. Melee (2001), and has been one of three (the others being Meta Knight and King Dedede) as of Super Smash Bros. Brawl (2008). He reprises his role as a playable character in Super Smash Bros. for Nintendo 3DS and Wii U (2014) and Super Smash Bros. Ultimate (2018), the latter of which features him playing a starring role in the "World of Light" story mode in which he survives Galeem's massacre of all of the other fighters.

Anime

Kirby appears in his own anime titled Kirby: Right Back at Ya!, (Japanese: 星のカービィ Hoshi no Kābī) in Japan. The series was licensed in North America by 4Kids Entertainment and the Canadian company Nelvana, and produced by Warpstar Inc., a company formed between a joint investment between Nintendo and HAL Laboratory. It aired on 4Kids TV, via Chubu-Nippon Broadcasting (since 2001 which has done 100 episodes).

The anime series is set in its own universe independent of the games and offers its own take on the setting and characters, however, Kirby's creator, Masahiro Sakurai, was greatly involved in its creation, so it did not stray far from his vision of how Kirby should be. The anime contains darker themes not yet introduced in the games (such as war and death) while still maintaining the cheerful and surreal themes the games are known for.

In the anime Kirby's origin and backstory are explored much more deeply than in the games. Kirby is a legendary Star Warrior who, according to legend, is fated to save Pop Star from destruction, but he was awoken from his slumber 200 years too early by mistake and as such has many baby or childlike qualities. Because of his age, he is still getting the hang of his powers and depends even more on the help of his friends to pull through tough situations. It is also implied that Kirby was originally a creation of the ancient evil entity called Nightmare but refused to follow his evil orders and was discarded into the depths of space.

Kirby's Warpstar is also expanded upon, as in the games it is a mode of transportation, but here the Warpstar is also the source of his power. As he's too young to keep it safe for himself, Tiff takes it upon herself to keep the Warpstar safe.

Though Sakurai instructed that Kirby not speak in full sentences (citing the Peanuts character Snoopy) he did allow him to use a small vocabulary including a catch phrase "Poyo" and the names of various attacks and characters.

Prior to this Kirby was also in a short educational video that was released exclusively in Japan in 1994, designed to teach Kanji to young children. The feature was not animated, but contained illustrations and was bundled with a similar video featuring Mario and Wario.

Manga and comics
Kirby also stars in several manga adaptations, which have been drawn by over 20 manga artists. The longest running series, Kirby of the Stars: The Story of Dedede Who Lives in Pupupu, was serialized in CoroCoro Comic from 1994 to 2006, which has been compiled into 25 tankōbon volumes, with over 10 million copies being printed. It continued serialization in CoroCoro Aniki in 2017. Viz Media originally planned to release the manga in English in September 2010, but it was pushed back and eventually cancelled. The series was later published as a "best-of" collection, which also features new chapters from its continued serialization, and was published in English as Kirby Manga Mania by Viz Media.

The German Club Nintendo magazine (2002-2015) often featured comics starring various Nintendo characters, including Kirby. In his comics, Kirby is reimagined as a detective and King Dedede as his sidekick. These comics were promotions for Kirby games that were released in Germany at the time including Kirby's Dream Course (1994), Kirby's Avalanche (1995), and Kirby's Dream Land 2 (1995).

Reception

Since he first appeared in Kirby's Dream Land (1992), Kirby has received positive reception. Nintendo Power listed Kirby as their 19th favourite hero, commenting that he does not get the respect that he deserves. Kirby ranked second on GameDaily's Top 10 Super Smash Bros. characters list. They also included him in their "Pretty in Pink Video Game Characters" article. GamesRadar listed Kirby as one of the most lovable blobs, calling him one of the cutest things to appear in a Nintendo game, yet also describing the way he defeats his enemies as "horrific." He ranked sixth on IGN's top 10 veteran Super Smash Bros. characters, described as the "pinkest badass ever made". An issue of the webcomic VG Cats depicts Kirby in 100 forms from both video games and other forms of media, such as characters from The Legend of Zelda, Metal Gear and Gundam. In 2011, Cheat Code Central ranked Ninja Kirby as the ninth top ninja in video games.

UGO Networks listed Kirby on their list of "The Cutest Video Game Characters", stating "it's easy to get on board with someone who will eat anything." In 2009, GameSpot chose him as one of the characters to compete in their poll for the title of "All Time Greatest Game Hero". In a 2010 Famitsu poll, Kirby was voted by readers as the 12th most popular video game character. The 2011 Guinness World Records Gamer's Edition lists Kirby as the 18th most popular video game character. In 2012, GamesRadar ranked him as the 40th "most memorable, influential, and badass" protagonist in games, saying "[i]f you don't think a pink blob can be tough, then you clearly haven't seen Kirby in action". Jeremy Parish of Polygon ranked 73 fighters from Super Smash Bros. Ultimate "from garbage to glorious", listing Kirby third and stated that "he's probably the single most consistent character in the Nintendo mascot lineup... And his “copy power” makes him unpredictably fun to play as in Smash." Gavin Jasper of Den of Geek ranked Kirby as first of Super Smash Bros. Ultimate characters, stating that "Kirby is the glue holding Smash together."

See also

 List of Kirby characters
 King Dedede
 Meta Knight

References

External links
 Kirby's Official U.S. homepage
 Kirby on Play.Nintendo.com
 The Evolution of Kirby

Child characters in anime and manga
Child characters in video games
Child superheroes
Extraterrestrial characters in video games
Extraterrestrial superheroes
Fictional amorphous creatures
Fictional characters with absorption or parasitic abilities
Fictional characters with dimensional travel abilities
Fictional characters with elemental and environmental abilities
Fictional characters with superhuman strength
Fictional extraterrestrial humanoids
Fictional infants
Fictional invertebrates
Fictional roboticists
Fictional space pilots
Kirby (series) characters
Male characters in video games
Nintendo protagonists
Shapeshifter characters in video games
Silent protagonists
Super Smash Bros. fighters
Video game characters introduced in 1992
Video game mascots